The Oakland California Temple (formerly the Oakland Temple) is a temple of the Church of Jesus Christ of Latter-day Saints (LDS Church) located in the hills of Oakland, California. It was built in the early 1960s, as part of a project announced by church president David O. McKay with a five-spire East Asian architectural design topped by a Buddhist symbol similar to the San Francisco Peace Pagoda on the main spire. The temple has become a cultural landmark for the local community, featuring a visitors' center as well as a garden with fountains frequently used in photoshoots for events like proms and weddings. The site also offers views of the Bay Area core, including the downtown Oakland and downtown San Francisco city skylines, the Port of Oakland, the Bay Bridge, Yerba Buena Island, Sutro Tower, and the Golden Gate Bridge. The auditorium hosts performances open to the public such as dance, music, and pageants.

History

The building of the Oakland Temple, as well as other LDS Church temples in California was considered as early as 1847. LDS Church members who had traveled by ship around Cape Horn to California were told by Brigham Young that "in the process of time, the shores of the Pacific may yet be overlooked from the Temple of the Lord."

The site where the Oakland Temple now stands was inspected by McKay, then second counselor in the church's First Presidency, in 1942. The  were purchased by the church on January 28, 1943. Ground was broken for the temple in 1962.

On February 23, 2017, the church announced that beginning February 2018, the temple would close for renovations that would be completed in 2019. Following completion of the renovations, a public open house was held from 11 May through 1 June 2019, excluding Sundays.  The temple was rededicated on Sunday, June 16, 2019, by Dallin H. Oaks. The renovation included putting the front doors back in use, updating upholstery, installing new carpeting, updating the electrical system, new paneling, and restoring an outdoor reflecting pool. A new visitors' waiting area was added that features added windows that gather light reflected from the reflection pool outside. In 2020, the Oakland California Temple was closed in response to the coronavirus pandemic.

The temple today

Built in the 1950s, the inter-stake center is the oldest church building at the site. Originally referred to as the "tri-stake center", the building served the San Francisco, Oakland, and Berkeley stakes. The center includes two chapels for sacrament meetings, an auditorium, a gymnasium, several classrooms, and offices. As of May 2021, the building is used by 14 congregations in languages of English, Spanish, Chinese, and Khmer.

There is a Family History Center (FHC), an LDS Employment Center, an LDS Distribution Center, and the headquarters of the California Oakland–San Francisco Mission. In addition, a small memorial to the Brooklyn is located on the west side of the property.

Visitors' center 

Adjacent to the temple is the visitors' center (opened 1992) which includes artwork, displays, and a reproduction of Thorvaldsen's Christus statue. Visitors can also learn about the temple, have questions answered, and learn more about the LDS Church. The visitors' center is staffed by volunteers, and open to the public. In 2004, the visitors' center was remodeled to better emphasize Jesus Christ and Joseph Smith's Restoration.

Garden & pool 

The temple grounds are set on 18.1 acres and includes a long cascading waterfall, reflection pool, walled courtyard, fountains, and a roof-terrace garden. For many local photographers, the temple garden & pool are a hotspot for photoshoots, particularly for Catholic quinceañeras, as well as homecomings, proms, and weddings. The grounds are accented by flowers, palm trees, and a formal-style man-made river running from one fountain to the other.

Christmas 

Every holiday season since 1978, the temple grounds are lit up with thousands of Christmas lights. It originally started with 50,000 multi-colored lights. By 1998, the Christmas display had grown to 500,000 lights that could be seen from the San Francisco Bay. Along with the lights, musical performances and dances are organized to celebrate Christmas and the birth of Jesus Christ.

Auditorium 

The auditorium seats 1,600 people and has a  stage. When more seating is needed, the auditorium can be extended into a large cultural hall that's large enough to fit two full-size basketball courts. The cultural hall was used years ago as a practice facility for the NBA's Golden State Warriors. The concert hall is home to the Temple Hill Symphony Orchestra, Temple Hill Choir, and the Temple Hill Dance Company. In addition, the concert hall hosts other musicians, singers, and performance groups. Besides the three resident organizations and the temple pageant, many Brigham Young University (BYU) performing arts groups have performed in the auditorium.

Family history center 

The family history center (FHC) helps people find and identify their ancestors. Open to the public, volunteers will help anybody interested in tracing their own genealogy. Many members of the local community frequently visit the family history. Four out of every five visitors to the FHC are not members of the LDS Church. Genealogical activities by LDS Church members date back decades prior to the building of the Oakland California Temple.

Design 

Designed by architect Harold W. Burton in 1962, the temple features a combination of Art Deco, Asian, and midcentury elements. Recent renovations in 2019 renovation took place lead by architect David Hunter & interior designer Karen Willardson. The building has many Asian-inspired elements represented in the structure of the building along with the interior design. As with other LDS-built temples, the Oakland one was built using the "finest craftsmanship and materials available."

The temple sits on a prominent site in the Oakland hills and has become a local landmark. Through the front courtyard are stairways which lead to the temple terrace situated above the ground floor of the temple. From the temple grounds and terrace are views of the Bay Area, including downtown Oakland, the Bay Bridge, Yerba Buena Island, downtown San Francisco and the Golden Gate Bridge. The grounds are accented by flowers, palm trees, and a formal-style man-made river running from one fountain to the other.

The temple & its associated complex of buildings are referred to by some as "Temple Hill."

Exterior 

Located in the city of Oakland, California, at 4770 Lincoln Ave, it is the only LDS temple built with a modern five-spire design. The five exterior golden spires reflect the sun with the tallest spire reaching 170 feet. The exterior of the temple is reinforced concrete faced with sierra white granite from Raymond, California. On the north and south faces of the temple are two decorative friezes; it is the last LDS temple to have such. The back (south side) is a depiction of Christ descending from heaven to the people of the American continent soon after his resurrection in the Holy Land. A north face of the building features a relief sculpture that depicts Christ teaching His disciples, which includes both men and women. Within the front garden courtyard there is a statue of children in front of a bronze plaque bearing a scripture from 3 Nephi chapter 17 in the Book of Mormon, relating how Christ blessed the children during his visit to the people of ancient America. Near the main entrance of the temple, "Holiness to the Lord, the House of the Lord" is inscribed.

At night, the exterior of the building is lit up. Some refer to it as "the beacon on the hill" because the temple is visible to much of the Bay Area. The Federal Aviation Administration (FAA) uses the Oakland California Temple as a navigation beacon.

Interior 

The goal of the interior design is to bring a remembrance of Jesus Christ to those who visit the temple. The interior of the temple décor is “subdued, with shades of tan and brown and traditional furnishings.” Found throughout the temple are paintings and other pieces of artwork. The walls feature white oak paneling accented by marble flooring. Artwork includes paintings, murals, and relief artworks. The lobby has a relief artwork representing Adam and Eve and another with Christ in the garden at Gethsemane. Other paintings throughout the building are a mix of scenes from the life of Jesus Christ and nature scenes of California landscapes. Several rooms include full length mirrors, opulent crystal sconces, and refined oriental designed seating. The baptistry features gold leaf decorations on the ceiling, marble columns, and bronze railings. The sealing rooms are adorned with dark cherry wood paneling, backlit marble altars, and mirrors that create an infinite reflection. Some of the sealing rooms feature barrel vaulted ceilings.

Presidents
Notable presidents of the temple have included Lorenzo N. Hoopes (1985–90) and Durrel A. Woolsey (1996–99).

And it Came to Pass Pageant

In the nearby Interstake Center, local members performed a Latter-day Saint pageant (an annual theatrical production) for many years. The pageant, commonly known as the "Temple Pageant," was a musical stage production rehearsing the history and legacy of the LDS Church. It was one of only a few "temple pageants" around the country; others include the Easter Pageant in Mesa, Arizona, and the Mormon Miracle Pageant in Manti, Utah. Until its retirement, it was the only such pageant performed indoors as well as the only one to be fully accompanied by a live orchestra. Initially, the pageant consisted of three acts performed over three consecutive nights; however, it was eventually shortened to an hour and a half. In November 2007, a letter sent to stake and mission presidents in the region from D. Todd Christofferson, then of the Presidency of the Seventy, indicated that the pageant would no longer be held.

Organizations
The Temple Hill Symphony Orchestra was formed in 1985. It has 52 members, about a third of whom are not Latter-day Saints. It has other sponsors besides the LDS Church and is a non-profit organization that offers free concerts. It is currently directed by John Pew.

There is also a Temple Hill Public Affairs Council which seeks to use the resources on the location to raise awareness of the LDS Church and its mission. As of 2007, it was directed by Lorenzo Hoopes.

The Temple Hill Choir and Behold Dance Collective—The Temple Hill Dance Company are also based here.

Gallery

See also

 Comparison of temples of The Church of Jesus Christ of Latter-day Saints
 List of temples of The Church of Jesus Christ of Latter-day Saints
 List of temples of The Church of Jesus Christ of Latter-day Saints by geographic region
 Temple architecture (Latter-day Saints)
 The Church of Jesus Christ of Latter-day Saints in California

References

External links
 
 Oakland California Temple Official site
 Oakland California Temple at ChurchofJesusChristTemples.org

20th-century Latter Day Saint temples
Religious buildings and structures in Oakland, California
Religious buildings and structures in Alameda County, California
Religious buildings and structures completed in 1964
Temples (LDS Church) in California
Tourist attractions in Oakland, California
1964 establishments in California